Roy Chiao (16 March 1927 – 15 April 1999) was a Hong Kong actor, most notable in the United States for playing the minor villain Lao Che in the 1984 movie Indiana Jones and the Temple of Doom.

Biography
Chiao was born in Shanghai in 1927. His father was a supporter of Sun Yat-sen and was part of the Chinese Revolution. During the Korean War, Chiao went to Taiwan. He joined the United States Army at some stage, and with him being fluent in Mandarin, Cantonese, Shanghainese, and English, he was a broadcaster and interpreter for the army. In 1955, he went to Japan and there he met actress Bai Guang who cast him in the 1956 film Xian mu dan.

Chiao married Liu Yen-Ping when he was in his twenties. She was a disc-jockey. Both he and his wife were Christians. Chiao had been a devout Christian since his early twenties. In 1964 he and his wife immigrated to Seattle. In his later years he became involved in missionary work.

He was the founder of "Artists' Home," a Christian Fellowship for actors in Hong Kong. Singer-songwriter Zac Kao is one of the people who have been positively affected by Chio.

He suffered three heart attacks before his heart disease-related death.

Career
The English speaking film appearances that Chiao appeared in included roles in the 1988 Jean-Claude Van Damme film Bloodsport, the 1973 Bruce Lee film Enter the Dragon and the 1978 version of Lee's Game of Death. He performed in many Hong Kong films with a career total of 90 films.

1950s to 1960s
Chiao's screen debut was in the 1956 film  Xian mu dan which came about as a result of his meeting actress Bai Guang. She had cast him in the film. On her recommendation he went to MP&GI in 1957 and that year he was signed to them.

Recognized as a handsome leading man, in the 1959 film, Ferry to Hong Kong, Chiao played the part of the Americanized Johnny Sing-Up, a black leather jacket, blue jean wearing Elvis styled gangster from America. Sing-Up was the partner of a pirate called Yen (played by Milton Reid) who board a ferry that has been battered in a storm and drifting near the China Coast.

1970s to 1999
In a type of send-up of his award-winning role in Summer Snow, Chiao played the part of the Alzheimer disease stricken grandfather of Tung Tzun in  the 1996 film Blind Romance.
He had suffered from three heart attacks and died of heart disease.

Selected filmography

 Heng chong zhi zhuang (1950)
 Alishan feng yun (1956)
 Xian mu dan (1959)
 Qing chun er nu (1959) - Niu Mai (Buffalo)
 San xing ban yue (1959) - Chang Ping-chung
  (Kong zhong xiao jie) (1959) - Lei Daying
 Ferry to Hong Kong (1959) - Johnny Sing-Up
 Tian chang di jiu (1959)
 Lan gui feng yun (1959)
 Liu yue xin niang (1960) - Mai Qin
 Chang tui jie jie (1960) - Xiao Jin / Jin Junior
 Nu mi shu yan shi (1960)
 Mu yu nu (1960) - Yuan Zhitang
 Xin xin xiang yin (1960)
 Kuai le tian shi (1960) - Jin Wenou
 Tie bi jin gang (1960)
 Hong nan lu nu (1960)
 Yu lou san feng (1960) - Zheng Dajiang
 Sha ji chong chong (1960) - Luo Shouli
 Zei mei ren (1961)
 You xi ren jian (1961)
 Tao li zheng chun (1962) - Xu Zhaofeng
 Huo zhong lian (1962) - Tian Shaoqing
 Ye hua lian (1962)
  (Hǎo shì chéng shuāng) (1962) - Wang Shu
 Jiao wo ru he bu xiang ta (1963) - Jin Shiming
 Die hai si zhuang shi (1963)
 Xi Taihou yu Zhen Fei (1964)
 Ti xiao yin yuan shang ji (1964) - Liu - The Warlord General
 Ti xiao yin yuan xia ji (1964) - Liu - The Warlord General
 Shen gong yuan (1964) - Hong Chengchou
 Luan shi er nu (1966) - Ma Jen-shan
 Bai tian e (1967)
 Five Golden Dragons (1967) - Inspector Chiao
 Wo de ai ren jiu shi ni (1967) - Ling Chi Chiu
 Jue dou e hu ling (1968) - Diao Jinghu
 Yan ling dao (1968) - 2nd Chief Yueh
 The Arch (1968) - Captain Yang
 You long xi feng (1968)
 Hu shan hang (1969) - Ching Wu Chih
 Jia bu jia (1970) - (Guest star)
 Xue lu xue lu (1970) - Driver
 A Touch of Zen (1971) - Hui Yuan
 Cheating Panorama (1972)
 Hei lung (1973)
 Enter the Dragon (1973) - Shaolin Abbott (uncredited)
 The Fate of Lee Khan (1973) - Tsao Yu-kun
 Pian shu qi zhong qi (1973) - Fur coat grifter
 Hen ye qing deng (1974)
 Golden Needles (1974) - Lin Toa
 Games Gamblers Play (1974) - Ticketed Man at Bar (Guest star)
 Yinyang jie (1974)
 Yun cai tong zi xiao zu zong (1974)
 Zhong lie tu (1975) - Yu Da-you
 Lao fu zi (1975)
 The Last Message (1975) - Cheng Ming
 Tian cai yu bai chi (1975) - Mr. Chiang Wo
 Lan qiao yue leng (1975)
 Da jia le (1975)
 Zhong yuan biao ju (1976) - (Guest star)
 Yi qi guang gun zou tian ya (1977)
 Foxbat (1977) - Doctor Vod
 Da sha xing yu xiao mei tou (1978) - Drunken Sheng
 Game of Death (1978) - Henry Lo
 Wen ni pa wei (1978)
 Enter the Fat Dragon (1978) - Chiu
 Shen tou miao tan shou duo duo (1979) - Biggie
 Meng zai Sha mei miao zhen tan (1979)
 Huang shi shi (1979) - (Guest star)
 Bo za (1980) - White Norman
 Yi er san (1980)
 Shi ba (1980) - Chu Tung Shen
 Game of Death 2 (1981) - Abbot
 Da li xiao shui shou (1981)
 Chuang ban shen tan dian zi gui (1981)
 Once Upon a Mirage (1982) -  Policeman Ma
 Chiu pei nui hok sang (1982)
 Meng (1983)
 Feng shui er shi nian (1983) - (Cameo)
 Indiana Jones and the Temple of Doom (1984) - Lao Che
 Ge wu sheng ping (1985)
 The Protector (1985) - Harold Ko
 Heart of Dragon (1985) - Restaurant Owner
 Aces Go Places IV (1986) - The Professor
 Wu long da jia ting (1986)
 Righting Wrongs (1986) - Magistrate Judge
 Shen tan zhu gu li (1986) - Chief Inspector Chiao
 Zhao hua xi shi (1987)
 Dragons Forever (1988) - Judge Lo Chung-Wai
 Bloodsport (1988) - Senzo Tanaka
 Fa da xian sheng (1989)
 Lady Reporter (1989)
 Long zhi zheng ba (1989) - Hwa's father
 Shadow of China (1989) - Lee Hok Chow
 Do wong (1990)
 Bamboo in Winter (1991) - Father
 A Kid from Tibet (1992) - Lawyer Robinson
 Cageman (1992) - Koo Yiu-Cho
 Treasure Hunt (1994) - Uncle Bill
 Mr. X (1995) - Roy
 Summer Snow (1995) - Lin Sun
 Dai lo bai sau (1995) - Great Uncle
 Ma ma fan fan (1995) - Death
 Tou tou ai ni (1996) - Tung-Tung's Grandfather
 All's Well, Ends Well 1997 (1997) - Mr. Lo
 Tin sai ji shing (1999) - Uncle Wang (final film role)

References

External links

 Hong Kong Cinemagic: Roy Chiao Hung
 alt.asian-movies discussion on Roy Chiao

 

1927 births
1999 deaths
20th-century Hong Kong male actors
Chinese emigrants to Hong Kong
Hong Kong expatriates in the United States
Hong Kong male film actors
Hong Kong male television actors
Male actors from Shanghai
TVB actors